Abacetus discolor is a species of ground beetle in the subfamily Pterostichinae. It was described by Roth in 1851.

References

discolor
Beetles described in 1851